George Smith (1876 – 14 January 1915) was a British tug of war competitor who competed in the 1908 Summer Olympics. In 1908 he won the silver medal as member of the British team Liverpool Police.

References

External links
profile

1876 births
1915 deaths
British police officers
Olympic tug of war competitors of Great Britain
Tug of war competitors at the 1908 Summer Olympics
Olympic silver medallists for Great Britain
Olympic medalists in tug of war
Medalists at the 1908 Summer Olympics